The siege of Meaux was fought from October 1421 to May 1422 between the English and the French during the Hundred Years' War. The English were led by King Henry V. Henry became ill while fighting this long battle, which took place during the winter months, and died on 31 August as a result.

Background

Henry had returned from England in June 1421 with 4,000 troops, and he set off immediately to relieve the Duke of Exeter at Paris.  The capital was threatened by French forces, based at Dreux, Meaux, and Joigny. The king besieged and captured Dreux quite easily, and then went south, capturing Vendôme and Beaugency before marching on Orléans.  He did not have sufficient supplies to besiege such a large and well-defended city, so after three days he went north to capture Villeneuve-le-Roy. This accomplished, Henry marched on Meaux with an army of more than 20,000 men.

Siege

The town's defense was led by the Bastard of Vaurus, by all accounts cruel and evil, but a brave commander all the same. The siege commenced on 6 October 1421, mining and bombardment soon brought down the walls.
 
Many allies of King Henry were there to help him in the siege. Arthur III, Duke of Brittany, recently released from an English prison, came there to swear allegiance to the King of England and serve with his Breton troops. Duke Philip III of Burgundy was also there, but many of his men were fighting in other areas:
In Picardy, Jean de Luxembourg and Hugues de Lannoy, master of archers, accompanied by an Anglo-Burgundian army attacked, in late March 1422 and conquered several places in Ponthieu and Vimeu despite the efforts of troops of Joachim Rouhault Jean Poton de Xaintrailles and Jean d'Harcourt while in Champagne, Count Vaudemont was defeated in battle by La Hire.

Casualties began to mount in the English army, including John Clifford, 7th Baron de Clifford who had been at the siege of Harfleur, the Battle of Agincourt, and received the surrender of Cherbourg. Also killed in the siege was 17-year-old John Cornwall, only son of famous nobleman John Cornwall, 1st Baron Fanhope. He died next to his father, who witnessed his son’s head being blown off by a gun-stone. The English also began to fall sick rather early into the siege, and it is estimated that one sixteenth of the besiegers died from dysentery and smallpox while thousands died thanks to the courageous defense of the men-at-arms inside the city.

As the siege continued, Henry himself grew sick, although he refused to leave until the siege was finished. Good news reached him from England that on 6 December, Queen Catherine had borne him a son and heir at Windsor.

On 9 May 1422, the town of Meaux surrendered, although the garrison held out.  Under continued bombardment, the garrison gave in as well on 10 May, following a siege of seven months. The Bastard of Vaurus was decapitated, as was a trumpeter named Orace, who had once mocked Henry. John Fortescue was then installed as English captain of Meaux Castle.

Aftermath

By this time, Henry was quite ill. Shortly after the siege, while en route to Cosne-sur-Loire, he found himself unable to ride, and had to be carried to Vincennes, where he arrived on 10 August. Henry V died at Vincennes 31 August 1422, aged 35.

Citations

Bibliography

 

Meaux
1421 in England
1422 in England
1420s in France
Conflicts in 1421
Conflicts in 1422
Henry V of England
History of Seine-et-Marne
Meaux
Hundred Years' War, 1415–1453